Chloroclystis exilipicta is a species of moth of the  family Geometridae. It is found in Mauritius and La Réunion.

See also
List of moths of Mauritius
List of moths of Réunion

References

de Joannis 1906. Descriptions de Lépidoptères nouveaux de l'île Maurice. Annales de la Société Entomologique de France 75(2):169–183, pl. 9.

Chloroclystis
Moths described in 1906
Moths of Mauritius
Moths of Réunion